refbase is web-based institutional repository and reference management software which is often used for  self-archiving. refbase is licensed under the GPL and written in PHP and uses a MySQL backend.

It can import and export a variety of standard bibliographic formats, including BibTeX, EndNote, RIS, ISI, MODS XML, PubMed, Medline, RefWorks, and Copac.  It can generate formatted bibliographies and citations in LaTeX, RTF, HTML, and PDF. refbase also has advanced search features and can generate RSS feeds from searches.  Links using DOIs and URLs can be added, as can links to files.  refbase supports the Search/Retrieve via URL (SRU) and OpenSearch web services as well as COinS and unAPI metadata.

refbase packages have been put in the official Gentoo Linux and Mandriva Linux repositories and has been used by the United States Geological Survey.

See also

 Comparison of reference management software
List of free and open source software packages

External links
Official refbase website
refbase users (including databases which have 10,000 records for atom probe, cephalopods, conservation science, marine and polar science)
SourceForge project page

Free reference management software
Free institutional repository software
Library 2.0
Free BibTeX software
Free software programmed in PHP
Social cataloging applications